Trillium underwoodii, the longbract wakerobin, is a plant species found only in the southeastern United States (Alabama, Georgia,  and northern Florida).

Trillium underwoodii is a perennial herb up to 20 cm tall, spreading by means of underground rhizomes. Leaves are multi-toned, with light, medium and dark splotches. Flowers are foul-smelling, usually deep maroon or purplish red but occasionally yellow.

References

Case, Frederick W. and Case, Roberta B. (1997) Trilliums.

External links
 
 Floridata
 Native Florida Wildflowers
 Atlas of Florida Vascular Plants
 Evolution Plants
 
 

underwoodii
Endemic flora of the United States
Flora of Alabama
Flora of Georgia (U.S. state)
Flora of Florida
Plants described in 1897
Taxa named by John Kunkel Small
Flora without expected TNC conservation status